J-List is an online retailer of Japanese goods for consumers outside Japan, mainly otaku goods, anime, and manga. The company was established by American Peter Payne in 1996. Its head office is located in Isesaki, Gunma, Japan. JBOX is a division of J-List.

J-List also translates and publishes physical hentai doujinshi, art books, and tankōbons in English through its sister company, J18 Publishing.

References

External links 
 
Comics-related organizations
Comics retailers
Companies based in Gunma Prefecture
Hentai companies
Internet properties established in 1996
Manga industry
Online retailers of Japan
Retail companies established in 1996